Sudbury Rugby Union Football Club is a rugby union club located in Great Cornard near Sudbury, Suffolk. The first XV currently play in London 1 North, a sixth tier league in the English rugby union system.

League history
When the league system was established in 1987, Sudbury was placed in the fourth tier, playing in 1987–88 Courage Area League South. The remained at this level until 1993–94 Courage League Division 4 when they were relegated after finishing bottom. Since then they have drifted down the leagues, ending up at level 8. In the mid 2010s the club won two consecutive promotions and now play at the 5th level.

Club honours
1992–93 Courage National 4 South champions
London 2 North East/West promotion play-off winners (2): 2015-16, 2017-18
London 3 North East champions: 2014-15

References

External links
  Official club site

English rugby union teams
Rugby union in Suffolk